Limnomma is an extinct genus of ommatid beetle from the Middle Jurassic of China. The type and only known species Limnomma daohugouense is known from the Bathonian aged Daohugou Beds of Inner Mongolia, China.

References 

Ommatidae
Fossil taxa described in 2021
Prehistoric beetle genera